A dinosaur is a diverse group of animals of the clade Dinosauria.

Dinosaur, dinosaurs, or Dinosauria may also refer to:

Places
 Dinosaur, Colorado, a town in the United States
 Dinosaur Cove, a fossil-bearing site in Australia
 Dinosaur National Monument, in Colorado and Utah in the United States
 Dinosauria (museum), France

Literature
 "Dinosaurs" (short story), 1987 story by Walter Jon Williams
 "The Dinosaur" (short story), 1959 story by Augusto Monterroso
 Dinosaurs (2007 book), book by Thomas R. Holtz, Jr.
 National Geographic Dinosaurs, 2001 book about dinosaurs
 The Dinosaurs (1981 book), edited by Byron Preiss
 Dinosaurs! (1990 anthology), science-fiction anthology
 Dinosaurs (1996 anthology), science-fiction anthology
The Dinosauria, nonfiction book about dinosaurs

Music
 "Dinosaur" (Kesha song), 2010
 "Dinosaur" (Kisschasy song), 2010
 "Dinosaurs" (song), 2018 single from Ruby Fields
 "Dinosaur", single from King Crimson's 1996 album Thrak
 Dinosaur (Dinosaur Jr. album), 1985
 Dinosaur, initial name of the band Dinosaur Jr.
 Dinosaur (band), English jazz ensemble                                                                    
 Dinosaurs (band), Bay Area rock band
 Wee Sing Dinosaurs, 1991 album
 Dinosaur (B'z album), 2017

Television and film
 Dinosaur! (1985 film), American television documentary
 Dinosaur!, 1991 A&E documentary mini-series, hosted by Walter Cronkite
 Dinosaur (2000 film), American animated film produced by Walt Disney Feature Animation
 Dinosaur (1980 film), short film by Will Vinton
 Dinosaurs! (1987 film), short film by Ray Cioni that features the 1980 film
 Dinosaurs – The Movie, alternative title of Adventures in Dinosaur City (1991)
 Dinosaurs (TV series), an American family sitcom (1991–1994)
 Dinosaurs: Giants of Patagonia, 2007 film
 The Dinosaurs!, a 1992 TV miniseries
 "Dinosaurs", an episode of the television series Zoboomafoo
 "Dinosaurs", an episode of the television series Elmo's World
 Dinosaurus!, a 1960 science fiction film directed by Irvin Yeaworth

Others
 Dinosaur (Disney's Animal Kingdom), a ride at Walt Disney World, Florida
 Dempster Dinosaur, a garbage truck made by Dempster Brothers, Inc.
 Dinosaur Bar-B-Que, a restaurant, blues venue, and bar chain in New York
 Dinosaur Comics, a webcomic by Canadian writer Ryan North

See also
 Dinosaurus, an extinct genus of therapsid
 Dinosaurchestra, a 2006 album by Neil Cicierega
 Boeing X-20 Dyna-Soar, a US Air Force program to develop a spaceplane
 Dino (disambiguation)
 Saur (disambiguation)